Thorenoor is a small village in Kodagu district of Karnataka state, India.

Location
Thorenoor is located between Kushal Nagar and Hassan towns in Karnataka state.

Administration
Thorenoor is administered as part of Somvarpet Taluk in Kodagu district.

Burial Site
Scientists have discovered a megalithic burial site at Thorenoor. The discovery was made during a recent archaeological exploration conducted Prof T Murugeshi of the Department of Ancient History and archeology, MSRS College, Shirva.

Educational Organizations
Government Higher Primary School, Thorenoor was established in 1920.  The school has a library of 1,465 volumes. There are seven classrooms and seven teachers in the school.

Image gallery

See also 
 Madikeri
 Mangalore
 Somwarpet

References

Villages in Kodagu district